The Tripartite Pact, also known as the Berlin Pact, was an agreement between Germany, Italy, and Japan signed in Berlin on 27 September 1940 by, respectively, Joachim von Ribbentrop, Galeazzo Ciano and Saburō Kurusu. It was a defensive military alliance that was eventually joined by Hungary (20 November 1940), Romania (23 November 1940), Bulgaria (1 March 1941) and Yugoslavia (25 March 1941) as well as by the German client state of Slovakia (24 November 1940). Yugoslavia's accession provoked a coup d'état in Belgrade two days later. Germany, Italy and Hungary responded by invading Yugoslavia. The resulting Italo-German client state, known as the Independent State of Croatia, joined the pact on 15 June 1941.

The Tripartite Pact was, together with the Anti-Comintern Pact and the Pact of Steel, one of a number of agreements between Germany, Japan, Italy, and other countries of the Axis Powers governing their relationship.

The Tripartite Pact was directed primarily at the United States. Its practical effects were limited since the Italo-German and Japanese operational theatres were on opposite sides of the world, and the high contracting powers had disparate strategic interests. As such the Axis was only ever a loose alliance. Its defensive clauses were never invoked, and signing the agreement did not oblige its signatories to fight a common war per se.

Text

Background

Although Germany and Japan technically became allies with the signing of Anti-Comintern Pact of 1936, the 1939 Molotov–Ribbentrop Pact between Germany and the Soviet Union came as a surprise to Japan. In November 1939, Germany and Japan signed the "Agreement for Cultural Cooperation between Japan and Germany", which restored the "reluctant alliance" between them.

Later signatories
In a ceremonial speech following the signing of the pact on 27 September, Ribbentrop may have suggested that the signatories were open to accepting new signatories in the future. The Deutsche Allgemeine Zeitung (DAZ) reported his words as follows:
The purpose of the Pact is, above all things, to help restore peace to the world as quickly as possible. Therefore any other State which wishes to accede to this bloc (der diesem Block beitreten will), with the intention of contributing to the restoration of peaceful conditions, will be sincerely and gratefully made welcome and will participate in the economic and political reorganisation.
The official  (DNB), however, as well as most of the press, reported a slightly different version in which the words "having good will towards the pact" (der diesem Pakt wohlwollend gegenübertreten will) instead of "accede to" were used. It is likely that other nations were not envisioned to join the treaty and that Ribbentrop misspoke. The official record in the DNB, therefore, corrected his words to remove any reference to "accession" by other states but produced an awkward wording in the process.

The Italian foreign minister, Ciano, was resolutely opposed to the idea of adding smaller states to the pact as late as 20 November 1940; he argued in his diary that they weakened the pact and were useless bits of diplomacy.

Hungary
The Kingdom of Hungary was the fourth state to sign the pact and the first to join it after 27 September 1940. The Hungarian ambassador in Berlin, Döme Sztójay, telegraphed his foreign minister, István Csáky, immediately after news of the signing and of Ribbentrop's speech had reached him. He urged Csáky to join the pact and even claimed that it was the expectation of Germany and Italy that he would do so. He considered it especially important for Hungary to sign the pact before Romania did. In response, Csáky asked Sztójay and the ambassador in Rome, Frigyes Villani, to make enquiries regarding Hungary's accession and its potential obligations under the pact. On 28 September, the German secretary of state for foreign affairs, Ernst von Weizsäcker, informed Hungary that Ribbentrop had meant not a "formal accession" but merely "an attitude in the spirit of the Pact". The Italian answer was similar. Nonetheless, within a week, the Hungarian government had sent out formal notice of its "spiritual adherence" to the pact.

In the week after Hungary's "spiritual adherence", the Balkan situation changed. Germany granted a Romanian request to send troops to guard the Ploiești oil fields, and Hungary granted a German request to allow its troops to transit Hungary to get to Romania. On 7 October 1940, the first German troops arrived in Ploiești. It is probable that Romania's accession to the pact had been delayed until the German troops were in place for fear of the Soviets taking pre-emptive action to secure the oil fields for themselves. In turn, Hungary's accession had been delayed until Romania's had been negotiated. On about 9 October, Weizsäcker delivered a message from Ribbentrop to Sztójay to inform him that Hitler now wanted "friendly states" to join the pact. In a telephone conversation with Ciano on 9 or 10 October, Ribbentrop claimed that Hungary had sent a second request to join the pact. Mussolini reluctantly consented. On 12 October, Ribbentrop informed Sztójay that both Italy and Japan had consented to Hungary's accession. Since the Hungarian regent, Miklós Horthy, had specifically instructed Sztójay to ask for Hungary to be the first new state to accede to the pact, Ribbentrop granted the request.

Romania
The Kingdom of Romania had joined the Allied Powers in World War I and had received Transylvania from Austria-Hungary. After Germany and Italy awarded parts of Transylvania back to Hungary and Southern Dobruja back to Bulgaria and after the Soviet Union had taken Bessarabia and northern Bukovina, the Fascist Iron Guard party came to power and Romania joined the Tripartite Pact on November 23, 1940 because of the Romanian desire for protection against the Soviet Union.

In Marshal Ion Antonescu's affidavit read out at the IG Farben Trial (1947–1948), he stated that the agreement on entering the pact had been concluded before his visit to Berlin on 22 November 1940.

Slovakia
On 14 March 1939, the Slovak Republic was declared in the midst of the dismemberment of Czechoslovakia. Hitler invited Monsignor Jozef Tiso to be the new nation's leader. Soon after it was formed, Slovakia was involved in a war with neighboring Hungary. Slovakia had signed a "Protection Treaty" with Germany, which, however, refused to intervene. The war resulted in territorial gains by Hungary at Slovakia's expense. Even so, Slovakia supported the German invasion of Poland in 1939.

Shortly after the signing of the Tripartite Pact, Slovakia, following the Hungarian lead, sent messages of "spiritual adherence" to Germany and Italy.

On 24 November 1940, the day after Romania signed the pact, the Slovak prime minister and foreign minister, Vojtech Tuka, went to Berlin to meet Ribbentrop and signed Slovakia's accession to the Tripartite Pact. His purpose was to increase Tuka's standing in Slovakia relative to that of his rival, Tiso, although the Germans had no intention of permitting Tiso to be removed.

Bulgaria

The Kingdom of Bulgaria had been an ally of Germany and on the losing side in World War I. From the beginning, the Germans pressured Bulgaria to join the Tripartite Pact. On 17 November 1940, Tsar Boris III and Foreign Minister  met with Hitler in Germany. According to Hermann Neubacher, Germany's special envoy to the Balkans, Bulgaria's relation to the Axis powers was completely settled at that meeting. On 23 November, however, the Bulgarian ambassador in Berlin, Peter Draganov, informed the Germans that while Bulgaria had agreed in principle to join the pact, it wished to delay its signing for the time being.

The meeting with Hitler precipitated a visit to Bulgaria by the Soviet diplomat Arkady Sobolev on 25 November. He encouraged the Bulgarians to sign a mutual assistance pact that had first been discussed in October 1939. He offered Soviet recognition of Bulgarian claims in Greece and Turkey. The Bulgarian government, however, was disturbed by the subversive actions of the Bulgarian Communist Party in response to the talks, apparently at the Soviets' urging.

On 26 December 1940, the far-right politician Alexander Tsankov introduced a motion in the National Assembly urging the government to accede to the Tripartite Pact immediately, but it was voted down.

Bulgaria's hand was finally forced by Germany's desire to intervene in the Italo-Greek War, which would require moving troops through Bulgaria. With no possibility of resisting Germany militarily, Prime Minister Bogdan Filov signed Bulgaria's accession to the pact in Vienna on 1 March 1941. He announced that it was done partly in gratitude for Germany's assistance to Bulgaria in obtaining the Treaty of Craiova with Romania and that it would not affect Bulgaria's relations with Turkey or the Soviet Union. Later that day, Ribbentrop promised Filov that after the fall of Greece, Bulgaria would obtain an Aegean coastline between the Struma and Maritsa Rivers.

According to Article 17 of the Tarnovo Constitution, treaties had to be ratified by the National Assembly. In the case of the Tripartite Pact, the government sought to have the treaty ratified without debate or discussion. Seventeen opposition deputies submitted an interpellation and one, Ivan Petrov, asked why the National Assembly had not been consulted in advance and whether the pact involved Bulgaria in war. They were ignored. The pact was ratified by a vote of 140 to 20.

Yugoslavia

On 25 March 1941 in Vienna, Dragiša Cvetković, the prime minister of the Kingdom of Yugoslavia, signed the Tripartite Pact. On 27 March, the regime was overthrown in a military coup d'état with British support. Seventeen-year-old King Peter II was declared to be of age. The new Yugoslav government under Prime Minister and General Dušan Simović, refused to ratify Yugoslavia's signing of the Tripartite Pact and started negotiations with the United Kingdom and the Soviet Union. The enraged Hitler issued Directive 25 as an answer to the coup and then attacked both Yugoslavia and Greece on 6 April. The German Air Force bombed Belgrade for three days and nights. German ground troops moved in, and Yugoslavia capitulated on 17 April.

Independent State of Croatia
The Independent State of Croatia (Nezavisna Država Hrvatska, or NDH), created from some former territories of the conquered Yugoslavia, signed the Tripartite Pact on 15 June 1941.

Potential signatories

Soviet Union

Just prior to the formation of the Tripartite Pact, the Soviet Union was informed of its existence and the potential of its joining. Vyacheslav Molotov was thus sent to Berlin to discuss the pact and the possibility of the Soviet Union joining. The Soviets considered joining the Tripartite Pact to be an update of existing agreements with Germany. During the visit to Berlin, Molotov agreed in principle to the Soviet Union joining the pact if some details, such as Soviet annexation of Finland, could be worked out. The Soviet government sent a revised version of the pact to Germany on 25 November. To demonstrate the benefits of partnership, the Soviet Union made large economic offerings to Germany.

However, the Germans had no intention of allowing the Soviets to join the pact and were already making preparations for their invasion of the Soviet Union and were committed to doing so regardless of any action taken by the Soviets:

When they received the Soviet proposal in November, they simply did not reply. They, however, accepted the new economic offerings and signed an agreement for them on 10 January 1941.

Finland

Military co-operation between Finland and Nazi Germany started in late 1940 after Finland had lost a significant amount of its territory to Soviet aggression during the Winter War. Finland joined Operation Barbarossa on 25 June 1941, which started the Continuation War. In November, Finland signed the Anti-Comintern Pact, an anticommunist agreement directed against the Soviet Union, with many other countries allied with Germany. Soon, Germany suggested for Finland to sign the Tripartite Pact, but the Finnish government refused since Finland saw its war as a "separate war" from the Second World War and saw its objectives as different from those of Nazi Germany. Finland also wanted to maintain diplomatic relations with the Allies, particularly the United States. During the Second World War, Germany asked Finland several times to sign the pact but the Finnish government declined all offers. Diplomatic relations between Finland and the United States were maintained until June 1944 although the US ambassador had already been recalled. The United Kingdom, however, declared war on Finland on 6 December 1941 in support of its ally, the Soviet Union.

At the request of the German command, the Finns established a winter warfare school in Kankaanpää. It began its first two-month course for German officers and NCOs in December 1941. In the summer of 1942, the German-speaking Finnish instructors taught a course on forest warfare. General Waldemar Erfurth, the German liaison to the Finnish general headquarters, considered the school an outstanding success. It was also attended by some Hungarian officers.

Thailand

Japan attacked Thailand at 02:00 local time on 8 December 1941. The Japanese ambassador, Teiji Tsubokami, told the Thai foreign minister, Direk Jayanama, that Japan wanted only permission for its troops to pass through Thailand to attack the British in Malaya and Burma. At 07:00, Prime Minister Plaek Phibunsongkhram (Phibun) held an emergency cabinet meeting in Bangkok, and soon, a ceasefire was ordered. Phibun then met with Tsubokami, who offered him four options: to conclude a defensive–offensive alliance with Japan, to join the Tripartite Pact, to co-operate in Japanese military operations, or to agree to the joint defence of Thailand. Military co-operation was chosen, and the Tripartite Pact was rejected.

According to the postwar memoirs of Direk Jayanama, Phibun planned to sign the pact later but was prevented by Direk's opposition.

Tripartite relations, 1940–1943

The "joint technical commissions" required by the pact were established by an agreement of 20 December 1940. They were to consist of a general commission in each capital, consisting of the host's foreign minister and the other two partners' ambassadors. Under the general commission were to be military and economic commissions. On 15 December 1941, the first meeting of all three commissions in one capital, Berlin, took place, labelled a "Tripartite Pact Conference". It was decided there to form a "Permanent Council of the Tripartite Pact Powers", but nothing happened for two months. Only the Italians, whom the Japanese mistrusted, pushed for greater collaboration.

On 18 January 1942, the German and Italian governments signed two secret operational agreements: one with the Imperial Japanese Army and another with the Imperial Japanese Navy. The agreements divided the world along longitude 70° east into two major operational zones, but it had almost no military significance. Chiefly, it committed the powers to co-operation in matters of commerce, intelligence and communication.

On 24 February 1942, the Permanent Council met under the chairmanship of Ribbentrop, who announced that "the propaganda effect is one of the main reasons for our meetings". The representatives set up a propaganda commission and then adjourned indefinitely. The military commission in Berlin met only two or three times by 1943, and there were no trilateral naval talks at all. Germany and Japan conducted separate naval discussions, and Italy consulted the Japanese independently for its planned assault on Malta in 1942.

The economic relationship between the Tripartite powers was fraught with difficulty. Japan would not grant economic concessions to Germany in 1941 for fear of them ruining its negotiations with the United States. In January 1942, negotiations on economic co-operation began, but an agreement was not signed until 20 January 1943 in Berlin. Italy was invited to sign a similar agreement in Rome at the same time for propaganda purposes, but none of the supplementary Berlin protocols applied to Italo-Japanese relations.

"No separate peace" agreement
Japan first pressed Germany to join the war with the United States on 2 December 1941, only two days after notifying Berlin of its intention to go to war. Receiving no response, Japan approached Italy. At 04:00 on the morning of 5 December, Ribbentrop gave the Japanese ambassador a proposal, which had been approved by Italy, to join the war and to prosecute it jointly. On 11 December 1941, the same day as the German declaration of war against the United States and the Italian declaration, the three powers signed an agreement, already hammered out on 8 December, barring any separate peace with the United States or Britain. It was "intended as a propaganda accompaniment to the declaration of war".

Legacy
As the defensive alliance under the pact was never invoked, and as the main signatories were widely separated between Europe and Asia limiting co-operation between the European and Asian signatories, the impact of the Pact was limited. The historian Paul W. Schroeder has described it as rapidly declining from a "position of importance in late 1940 to one of merely nominal existence in late 1941" and as "virtually inoperative" by December 1941. However the Pact did prove useful in persuading the American people that Japan was acting in league with Germany. The charge that the Pact was part of an effort to co-ordinate aggression and achieve world domination also formed part of the case brought against the Nazi leaders at Nuremberg. Similarly the Tokyo War Crimes Trials also focused on the establishing of mixed technical commissions between Germany, Japan, and Italy as evidence that the Pact began functioning shortly after it was signed, and showed mutual support in aggression under the pact, though these commissions never actually functioned.

References

Sources

1940 in Germany
1940 in Italy
1940 in Japan
20th-century military alliances
Anti-communism
Foreign relations of Yugoslavia
Germany–Italy relations
Germany–Japan relations
Italy–Japan relations
Military alliances involving Bulgaria
Military alliances involving Hungary
Military alliances involving Italy
Military alliances involving Japan
Military alliances involving Nazi Germany
Military alliances involving Romania
Military alliances involving Yugoslavia
Treaties concluded in 1940
Treaties entered into force in 1940
Treaties of Croatia
Treaties of Nazi Germany
Treaties of the Slovak Republic (1939–1945)
Treaties of the Empire of Japan
Treaties of the Kingdom of Bulgaria
Treaties of the Kingdom of Hungary (1920–1946)
Treaties of the Kingdom of Italy (1861–1946)
Treaties of the Kingdom of Romania
Treaties of the Kingdom of Yugoslavia
World War II treaties
September 1940 events
1940s in Berlin
Axis powers
Germany–Romania relations